Agenzia Giornalistica Italia (AGI – Italian Journalistic Agency) is an Italian news agency. It is one of the main news agencies in the country.

History and profile
The Agenzia Giornalistica Italia was founded in 1950. The agency is based in Rome. In its initial phase it had a left-wing political stance. Then the agency became part of Ente Nazionale Idrocarburi (ENI) in 1960. The agency focuses on news about economics and industry.

It has collaborations with the international news agencies, including Associated Press, Dow Jones and ITAR TASS. It launched cooperation with the Vietnam News Agency in June 2014. With Il Sole 24 Ore and China Radio International has launched AGI China 24, a Chinese news agency in Italian language, mainly for Italian entrepreneurs in China, translating also Xinhua articles and bulletins.

References

External links
AGI English news

1950 establishments in Italy
Organizations established in 1950
News agencies based in Italy
Companies based in Rome
Mass media in Rome
Partly privatized companies of Italy
Government-owned companies of Italy
Eni